National archives are central archives maintained by countries. This article contains a list of national archives.

Among its more important tasks are to ensure the accessibility and preservation of the information produced by governments, both analogically and digitally, for the government itself, researchers and generations to come.

Some national archives collections are large, holding millions of items spanning several centuries, while others created recently have modest collections. In the last decade, digitization projects have made possible to browse records and contents online, although no archive have their entire collections published on the web.

A

B

C

D

 Danish National Archives
 Archivo General de la Nación de República Dominicana

E

 National Archives of Ecuador
 Egyptian National Library and Archives
 National Archives of Estonia
 Eswatini National Archives
 National Archives and Library of Ethiopia

F

 Jane Cameron National Archives (Falkland Islands)
 National Archives of the Faroe Islands
 National Archives of Finland
 Archives nationales (France)

G

 National Archives of Gabon
 National Archives of Ghana. This role was taken over by the Public Records and Archives Administration Department in 1997.

 German Federal Archives
 General Archives of the State (Greece)
 National Archives of Georgia
 Gibraltar Archives
 National Archives of Guinea

H

 National Archives of Haiti
 Government Records Service and Public Records Office, Hong Kong
 National Archives of Hungary

I

 National Archive of Iceland
 National Archives of India
 National Archives of Indonesia
 Iraq National Library and Archive
 National Archives of Ireland
 Israel State Archive
 Central Archives of the State (Italy)

J

 National Archives of Japan

K

 Kenya National Archives

L
 Centre des Archives Nationales (Lebanon)
 Center for National Documents and Records (Liberia)
 National Archives of Libya
 National Archives of Liechtenstein 
 Office of the Chief Archivist of Lithuania
 Archives nationales de Luxembourg (ANLux)

M

 National Archives of Madagascar
 National Archives of Malaysia
 National Archives of Malawi
 National Archives of Mali
 National Archives of Malta
 National Archives of the Marshall Islands
 National Archives of Mauritania
 National Archives of Mauritius
 General National Archive (Mexico)
 National Archives of Mongolia
 State Archives of Montenegro
 Bibliothèque Générale et Archives, Morocco
 Arquivo Histórico de Moçambique (Mozambique)
 National Archives of Myanmar

N

 National Archives of Namibia
 Nationaal Archief, Netherlands
 Archives New Zealand
 General National Archive (Nicaragua)
 Archives nationales du Niger
 National Archives of Nigeria
 Public Record Office of Northern Ireland
 National Archival Services of Norway

P
 Palestine National Archives, maintained by Palestinian Ministry of Culture.
 National Archives of Pakistan
 National Archives of Panama
 Archivo Nacional de Asunción, Paraguay
 Archivo General de la Nación del Perú
 National Archives of the Philippines
 Central Archives of Historical Records, Poland
 Archives of Modern Records, Poland
 Arquivo Nacional da Torre do Tombo, Portugal
 Archivo General de Puerto Rico

R

National Archives of Romania
Russian State Archive of Contemporary History
Russian State Archive of Literature and Art
Russian State Archive of Socio-Political History
State Archive of the Russian Federation
National Archives of Rwanda

S

 Saharawi National Archive
 State Archives of San Marino
 National Archives of Scotland
 Archives nationales du Sénégal
 National Archives of Serbia
 National Archives of Seychelles
 National Archives of Singapore
 Slovak National Archives
 Archives of the Republic of Slovenia
 National Archives of South Africa
 National Archives of Korea, South Korea
 , Spain
 Archivo General de Indias, Spain
 Archivo General de Simancas, Spain
 Department of National Archives, Sri Lanka
 National Archives of Sweden
 Federal Archives of Switzerland, Swiss Literary Archives, Swiss Film Archive and Swiss National Sound Archives
 National Archives of Sudan
 National Archives of South Sudan
 National Archives of Suriname

T
 National Archives Administration, National Development Council; Republic of China (commonly known as "Taiwan")
 Tanzania National Archives
 National Archives of Thailand
 Thai Film Archive
 National Archives of Togo
 National Archives of Trinidad and Tobago
 National Archives of Tunisia
 Ottoman Archives Turkey

U

 State Archive Service of Ukraine, Ukraine (list of institutions)
 National Archives (UAE), United Arab Emirates
 The National Archives (United Kingdom)
 National Archives and Records Administration, United States
 General Archive of the Nation, Uruguay

V

 National Archives of Vanuatu 
 Vatican Secret Archives
 National Archives of Venezuela

W

 West Indies Federal Archives Centre

Z

 National Archives of Zambia
 National Archives of Zimbabwe

See also
 Archives by country
 List of archives
 List of archivists
 Lists of film archives
 List of national libraries
 National library
 List of oldest institutions in continuous operation

References

External links

penrose-press.com - Directory of Libraries by subject and region, 2016 

National Archives
National archives
national archives